The Day of the Djinn Warriors is the fourth installment of seven in the Children of the Lamp series.

Plot summary

Djinn twins, John and Philippa Gaunt, are off on another trip around the world in book four of the bestselling Children of the Lamp series. It's a race against time as the twins attempt to save their mother, Layla Gaunt from her destiny of being Blue Djinn of Babylon, save their father, Edward Gaunt, from an aging curse brought from a binding their mother Layla put on their father to make sure the twins were home with him, and museums worldwide from unexplained robberies and bizarre hauntings.

As John and Philippa and their friends travel across the globe on their rescue mission, they notice that something very strange is happening: An evil force has woken the terracotta warriors created by an ancient Chinese emperor, and a spell has been cast possessing the soldiers with wicked spirits. Now, the very fate of the world hangs in the balance. It's up to the twins to solve the mysterious robberies, stop the terracotta warriors, rescue their parents, and save the world before it's too late.

References

American fantasy novels
Children of the Lamp
2007 American novels